Kevin Jolly is a retired male badminton player from England.

Career
He represented England and won a gold medal in the team event, at the 1978 Commonwealth Games in Edmonton, Alberta, Canada. In addition he competed in the singles, doubles and mixed doubles.

Achievements

IBF World Grand Prix 
The World Badminton Grand Prix sanctioned by International Badminton Federation (IBF) from 1983 to 2006.

Men's singles

References

English male badminton players
Living people
Year of birth missing (living people)
Badminton players at the 1978 Commonwealth Games
Commonwealth Games medallists in badminton
Commonwealth Games gold medallists for England
Medallists at the 1978 Commonwealth Games